M-Net Edge was a channel broadcast by South African pay TV satellite network DStv. It was launched on 20 October 2014, after the discontinuation of two of M-Net's Series channels.

The channel ceased its operations on 1 April 2017 as it was going to be integrated with M-Net to give customers a supersized channel with bumper to bumper entertainment.

Programming
 Bates Motel
 House Of Cards
 Better Call Saul
 Shameless
 Transparent
 Girls
 Vinyl
Billions
Killjoy
Vikings
Game Of Thrones
Lucifer
Gotham
Grimm
Rome
Person Of Interest
Stalker

References

M-Net
Television stations in South Africa
Television channels and stations established in 2014
Television channels and stations disestablished in 2017
Companies based in Johannesburg
2014 establishments in South Africa